Wilmerding is a surname. Notable people with the surname include:

Georgiana Wilmerding Phelps, nee Georgiana Wilmerding (1873–1960), American socialite
John Wilmerding (born 1938), American professor of art, collector, curator, and author